The handstand push-up (press-up) - also called the vertical push-up (press-up) or the inverted push-up (press-up) also called "commandos"- is a type of push-up exercise where the body is positioned in a handstand. For a true handstand, the exercise is performed free-standing, held in the air. To prepare the strength until one has built adequate balance, the feet are often placed against a wall, held by a partner, or secured in some other way from falling. Handstand pushups require significant strength, as well as balance and control if performed free-standing.

Similar exercises
The movement can be considered a bodyweight exercise similar to the military press, while the regular push-up is similar to the bench press.

Muscles
The primary muscles used in the handstand push-up are the anterior deltoid, middle deltoid, posterior deltoid, pectoralis major, upper trapezius, and triceps brachii.

Ability
The handstand push-up is measured in the Men's Gymnastics Functional Measurement Tool (MGFMT). According to one test on competitive male gymnasts in the United States, those competing at Level 4 averaged 3.0 handstand push-ups while those at Level 10 averaged 15.7.

References

External links

 - broken link

Bodyweight exercises
Weight training exercises